Limtex is an Indian multinational company, headquartered in Kolkata, West Bengal, India and a subsidiary of Limtex Group. It exports $40 million in Indian tea annually. Limtex is the leading producer, manufacturer and exporter of Indian Tea both in the domestic and international market. It also has an IT division - Limtex Infotech, which was formed in 2005.

Limtex has received various awards from National and International governing bodies for its excellence in the Tea & Coffee trade.

History

Formation & early years 
Limtex was founded in the year 1977 by Mr. Gopal Poddar now Chairman cum managing director of Limtex (India) ltd. As a small tea trading business, with turnover of Rs 1.02 lacs. Now it diversified into IT, tea trading, biscuit & export industries.

Annual turnover 
After 25 years in business it has earned $21 million from tea export only, with overall growth rate 60%.

Awards & nominations 
Limtex owned prestigious "National Export Award" by then Indian Prime Minister Shri A. B. Vajpayee, having been nominated by Federation of Indian Export Organization, in association with Ministry of Commerce, Government of India. Besides this, they have own other Export related awards from the Ministry of Commerce, Banks, Associations, etc. Limtex group has also been awarded the prestigious status of "Star Trading House" by the Government of India.

Limtex Group of Companies 
 Limtex (India) Limited
 Limtex Agri Udyog Ltd.
 Limtex Tea & Industries Ltd.
 Limtex Industries Ltd.
 Limtex Infotech Ltd.
 Sujali Tea & Industries Ltd.
 Satyanarayan Tea Co. Pvt. Ltd.
 Green Card Developers Pvt. Ltd.
 Poddar Exports

References

Official website 
 Limtex

Drink companies of India
Tea companies of India
Companies based in Kolkata
Food and drink companies established in 1977
Indian brands
Tea industry in West Bengal
1977 establishments in West Bengal